Albert Michael "Red" Kelly (November 15, 1884 – February 4, 1961), was a Major League Baseball rightfielder who played in  with the Chicago White Sox.

References

External links

1884 births
1961 deaths
Chicago White Sox players
Notre Dame Fighting Irish baseball players
Major League Baseball right fielders
Baseball players from Illinois
Des Moines Boosters players